The FIFA World Cup is an international association football competition established in 1930. It is contested by the men's national teams of the members of the FIFA, the sport's global governing body. The tournament has taken place organised every four years, except in 1942 and 1946, when the competition was cancelled due to World War II. A hat-trick occurs when a player scores three or more goals in a single match and it is considered an achievement, especially while playing at the largest international football tournament in the world. Across the over 800 matches at the 22 tournaments of the FIFA World Cup, 54 hat-tricks have been scored. The first hat-trick was scored by Bert Patenaude of the United States, playing against Paraguay in 1930; the most recent was by Kylian Mbappé of France, playing against Argentina on 18 December 2022. The only World Cup not to have at least one hat-trick scored was the 2006 FIFA World Cup in Germany. The record number of hat-tricks in a single World Cup tournament is eight, during the 1954 FIFA World Cup in Switzerland.

19 players have scored a hat-trick in the knockout stage of the FIFA World Cup. Two were playing in their first ever World Cup match, Edmund Conen and Angelo Schiavio, both in 1934, a tournament without a group stage. Geoff Hurst (1966) & Kylian Mbappé (2022) are the only players to have scored a hat-trick in the final. Two players have scored a hat-trick in the second group stage of the World Cup, Paolo Rossi and Zbigniew Boniek, both in 1982.

List

Notable World Cup hat-tricks
This section features records and notable hat-tricks relating to the men's World Cup. For notable hat-tricks at the Women's World Cup, see List of FIFA Women's World Cup hat-tricks#Notable World Cup hat-tricks.

Bert Patenaude was the first player to score a hat-trick in a World Cup match, on 17 July 1930 against Paraguay. However, until 10 November 2006 the first hat-trick that FIFA acknowledged had been scored by Guillermo Stábile of Argentina, two days after Patenaude. In 2006, FIFA announced that Patenaude's claim to being the first hat-trick scorer was valid, as teammate Tom Florie's goal in the match against Paraguay was re-attributed to him.
Four players have scored two hat-tricks in World Cup matches: Sándor Kocsis (both 1954); Just Fontaine (both 1958); Gerd Müller (both 1970); and Gabriel Batistuta (1994 and 1998). Batistuta is thus the only person to score hat-tricks in two World Cups. He has another unique record of scoring hat-tricks, both were achieved on 21 June of the year, against World Cup finals debutants (Greece and Jamaica), and each time the third goal was a penalty. Kocsis and Müller scored their hat-tricks in consecutive matches.
Oleg Salenko is the only player in World Cup history to have scored five goals in a single match. He did this during the 1994 FIFA World Cup match between Russia and Cameroon.
One player has scored a hat-trick on his international début: Guillermo Stábile (1930).
One player has scored four goals for the losing side: Ernst Wilimowski (5–6, 1938).
Three other players have scored a hat-trick for the losing side: Josef Hügi (5–7, 1954), Kylian Mbappe (3–3, losing 4–2 on penalties, 2022), and Igor Belanov (3–4, 1986).
One other player has scored a hat-trick in a game that his side did not win: Cristiano Ronaldo (3–3, 2018) 
There have been three occasions when two hat-tricks have been scored in the same match. Two occurred during the 1938 FIFA World Cup: when Sweden defeated Cuba, Gustav Wetterström and Harry Andersson, both playing for Sweden, scored three goals, with the former completing his in the first half. In the Brazil vs Poland, Leônidas did it for Brazil and Ernst Wilimowski for Poland. One occurred in 1954: when Austria defeated Switzerland, Theodor Wagner and Josef Hügi scored hat-tricks for Austria and Switzerland respectively.
Two players have scored hat-tricks in World Cup Finals. Geoff Hurst scored three goals for England against West Germany in the 1966 Final. This is also the longest hat-trick to be completed — most time between the first and third goals. His first goal came at 18', while the second and third goals were in extra time at 98' and 120'. Kylian Mbappé scored the other World Cup finals' hat-trick in the 2022 FIFA World Cup final for France against Argentina. His goals were scored at the 80th, 81st and 118th minute marks. Two of his goals - 80th and 118th - were successful penalty kicks. 
The quickest hat-trick by a player is Erich Probst, who scored at 4', 21', and 24' in 1954, playing for Austria against Czechoslovakia in the first round.  
The briefest hat-trick to be completed — that is, the shortest time between the first and third goals — is the one by László Kiss in 1982 against El Salvador. He scored at 69', 72', and 76', making the time between his first and third 7 minutes. This is also the only hat-trick scored by a substitute.
 The only players to have scored from three headers in a single match are Tomáš Skuhravý in 1990 and Miroslav Klose in 2002.
The youngest player to score a hat-trick is Pelé, at 17 years, 244 days.
The oldest player to score a hat-trick is Cristiano Ronaldo, at 33 years, 130 days. 
Germany (incl. West Germany) holds the record for most hat-tricks scored with 7. Germany also shares with South Korea the record for most hat-tricks conceded with 4.

See also 

 FIFA World Cup
 List of FIFA World Cup records and statistics

References

External links 

Hat-tricks
FIFA World Cup hat-tricks
FIFA World Cup
FIFA World Cup